Kuddewörde (old Saxon: Kuthenworden) is a municipality in the district of Lauenburg, in Schleswig-Holstein, Germany. It is situated at the river Bille.

In 1230 Kuddewörde is mentioned in the records of the bishop of Ratzeburg.

Today Kuddewörde is composed of the former municipalities of Kuddewörde and Rotenbek (former Rothenbek), which was integrated into the municipality of Kuddewörde in 1936.

Landmarks
 St. Andreaskirche, a church from the 13th century
 Grander Mühle, an ancient watermill dating back to 1303

References

External links
 community of Kuddewörde 

Municipalities in Schleswig-Holstein
Herzogtum Lauenburg